George Wein & the Newport All-Stars is an album by the American jazz pianist and entrepreneur George Wein featuring performances recorded in 1962 for the Impulse! label.

Reception
The AllMusic review by Scott Yanow stated: "this definitive set features one of the strongest versions of George Wein's Newport All-Stars... Highly recommended for Dixieland and small-group swing fans."

Track listing
 "At the Jazz Band Ball" (Nick LaRocca, Larry Shields) - 4:27   
 "The Bends Blues" (Pee Wee Russell) - 4:49   
 "Crazy Rhythm" (Irving Caesar, Joseph Meyer, Roger Wolfe Kahn) - 2:28   
 "Slowly" (David Raksin, Kermit Goell) - 4:34   
 "Ja-Da" (Bob Carleton) - 2:51   
 "Keepin' Out of Mischief Now" (Fats Waller, Andy Razaf) - 7:14   
 "Blue Turning Grey Over You" (Waller, Razaf) - 3:58   
 "Lulu's Back in Town" (Al Dubin, Harry Warren) - 7:36

Personnel
George Wein - piano, celeste
Ruby Braff - cornet
Marshall Brown - bass trumpet, valve trombone
Pee Wee Russell - clarinet
Bud Freeman – tenor saxophone
Bill Takas – double bass
Marquis Foster – drums

References

Impulse! Records albums
George Wein albums
1962 albums
Albums produced by Bob Thiele